Henry Sloane Coffin (January 5, 1877, in New York City – November 25, 1954, in Lakeville, Connecticut) was president of the Union Theological Seminary, Moderator of the Presbyterian Church in the United States of America, and one of the most famous ministers in the United States. He was also one of the translators of the popular hymn "O Come, O Come Emmanuel", along with John Mason Neale.

Biography

Coffin was the son of Edmund Coffin and Euphemia Sloane. He was an heir to the fortune of the furniture firm of W. and J. Sloane & Co. His brother was William Sloane Coffin, who was later the president of New York's Metropolitan Museum of Art.

Coffin attended Yale College and obtained a Bachelor of Arts in 1897.  In 1896, he was one of fifteen juniors invited to join the Skull and Bones. He then received his master's degree from Yale in 1900.

During his time at Yale, Coffin was on friendly terms with evangelist Dwight L. Moody, who devoted considerable attention to Coffin during his famous Northfield Conferences in Massachusetts.  In spite of Moody's influence, Coffin would emerge as a leading theological liberal.

Coffin also obtained his Bachelor of Divinity from the Union Theological Seminary in 1900. He then became pastor of Madison Avenue Presbyterian Church in New York City in 1910.  He declined an offer to become president of Union Theological Seminary in 1916.  In 1917, he became Chairman of the Committee of the Board of Home Missions.  In 1926, offered the presidency of Union a second time, he accepted and retained the post until 1945.

On March 20, 1927, Coffin preached at a 75th Anniversary service for the Central Congregational Church in Providence, Rhode Island.

Coffin was married to Dorothy Eells. He was the uncle of William Sloane Coffin, and a member of the Yale Corporation (1921–45).

Henry Sloane Coffin died in 1954 at age 77 and was interred at Sleepy Hollow Cemetery in Sleepy Hollow, NY.

Works

Music

Books

Articles and chapters

See also
 People on the cover of Time magazine - November 15, 1926

References

External links 
 
 

Presbyterian Church in the United States of America ministers
Yale College alumni
Union Theological Seminary (New York City) alumni
Union Theological Seminary (New York City) faculty
1877 births
American people of Scottish descent
1954 deaths
Burials at Sleepy Hollow Cemetery